Nicke Andersson (born 1 August 1972), also known as Nick Royale, is a Swedish musician best known for his work as the singer and guitarist for the rock band The Hellacopters and drummer for the death metal band Entombed. He was also briefly the drummer for Tiamat in 1989. Besides his work with the Hellacopters, Andersson currently plays and writes songs for the soul band The Solution, the death metal band Death Breath, the hard rock band Lucifer, and rock band Imperial State Electric. 

Andersson has been involved in well over a hundred different official releases with different bands, done work as a producer as well as created artwork for most of the bands he has been involved with.

Career
Andersson's interest began early in life with KISS as his favorite band and soon discovered his childhood friend and future bandmate Kenny Håkanssons father's record collection and bands such as The Ramones and Sex Pistols. His interest soon turned towards heavier music, trading cassettes and vinyl and writing for fanzines. It wasn't long before Andersson started playing music and was soon playing drums and guitars in rock and metal bands such as Brain Dead Bodies, The Breaking, Belsen Barnen, Parodi, Maximal Skandal, Sons of Satan, Blasphemy, Nihilist and a number of other bands.

Entombed

Andersson formed Nihilist after answering an ad in Heavy Sound, a record store in Stockholm. When Nihilist broke up in 1989, the same musicians formed Entombed with a different bass player. Andersson was predominantly the drummer in the band but also contributed with bass, guitars and vocals as well. Entombed took influences from many different genres but mostly from death metal in the band's first two albums Left Hand Path and Clandestine. With their third album the group started incorporating more traditional influences from hard rock and heavy metal and the album Wolverine Blues is widely considered to be the origin of death 'n' roll.

The Hellacopters

In late 1994, Andersson formed The Hellacopters as a side project together with Dregen, Kenny Håkansson and Robert Eriksson, all of whom earlier had been roadies during Andersson's time in Entombed. In January 1995 they released their first single Killing Allan on their own label Psychout Records. Their first full-length album Supershitty to the Max! was released in 1996 and was recorded in 25 hours and later awarded with a Grammies. The group recruited Anders Lindström and supported KISS on their Scandinavian shows in 1997. The album was followed up the next year with Payin' the Dues. Due to the band's success, Andersson left Entombed to focus full-time on his new band. However the next year guitarist Dregen left The Hellacopters to focus full-time on his other band Backyard Babies. With their third record The Hellacopters changed the direction of their music to a more cleaner sound than the early garage/punk rock style. The band continued to tour with temporary replacements before Robert 'Strings' Dahlqvist joined the band as their full-time guitarist. The band continued to release albums and tour extensively in Scandinavia, Europe and other parts of the world as well as opening up for The Rolling Stones on two shows in 2002. In 2006 The Hellacopters joined forces with The Hives, Backyard Babies, The Soundtrack of Our Lives and Millencolin and embarked on a successful tour throughout Sweden. The band broke up after the release of their 7th full-length album 'Head off', a collection of cover songs which was  followed in 2008 by a last tour through Europe and Scandinavia.

Scott Morgan collaborations

While on tour in USA with The Hellacopters, the band played several shows in the same venue as the former Sonic's Rendezvous Band singer Scott Morgan. This led to the formation of The Hydromatics which went on to release their first record Parts Unknown in 1999. Andersson and Morgan teamed up once again in 2004 this time under the name The Solution to release Communicate which was followed up with Will Not Be Televised in 2007.

Death Breath

In 2005 Death Breath was formed by Andersson and Robert Pehrsson. Soon Scott Carlson and Erik Wallin joined, making the band's lineup complete. The band plays metal music inspired by some of Andersson's favorite early extreme metal bands such as Venom, Autopsy and Celtic Frost. The band released Stinking Up the Night in 2006 and Let It Stink in 2007.

Cold Ethyl
After the breakup of The Hellacopters, Andersson formed Cold Ethyl along with Thomas Eriksson, Tobias Egge and Dolf De Borst from The Datsuns who opened up together with "Demons" for The Hellacopters during the later part of The Tour Before the Fall. The band states that they have no interest in recording or releasing any material at this time and that the only way to experience the band is through their live shows. the band played their first show at Debaser Slussen in Stockholm early 2009 and held a short tenure at the club "Fanclub".

Imperial State Electric

At first a Nicke Andersson solo recording project Imperial State Electric soon evolved into a touring band with the same members as Cold Ethyl. They toured Scandinavia and Europe during 2010–2011 on the back of the first self-titled record (released Jan. 2010). I.S.E played mostly headline shows and festivals but there were also support act slots to KISS and Guns N' Roses. For the recording of the second album "Pop War" (released 9 March 2012) Imperial State Electric was declared a band proper. The "Pop War" tour was unofficially started with two gigs supporting The Hives, one "by invitation only" secret gig on 28 March 2012 and one official The Hives gig three days later. The Imperial State Electric Pop War tour officially started on 4 April at Katalin in Uppsala, Sweden.

Lucifer

In March 2017, it was announced that Andersson had joined the band Lucifer as drummer. He had started writing songs with his now-wife and Lucifer vocalist Johanna Sadonis in 2016, when two of its members had left. As he is a multi-insturmentalist, Lucifer recorded their second album in Andersson's home studio without a complete band, only the addition of guitarist Robin Tidebrink. The band's third and fourth albums, Lucifer III (2021) and Lucifer IV (2022), were each nominated for Best Hard Rock/Metal at the Grammis awards.

Other work

In 1998 Andersson, together with former bandmate Dregen, Ginger (from The Wildhearts) and Thomas Skogsberg formed Supershit 666, the band's music was very reminiscent of the early Hellacopters sound. The band released a self-titled EP in 1999 but never played live. However Dregen and Ginger have both expressed interest in playing together again, possibly as Supershit 666. After releasing "By the Grace of God", Andersson was invited to join Wayne Kramer and the remaining members of the MC5 for their reunion tour in 2003 and 2004. 
In 2004 Andersson joined up with Swedish punk veteran Johan Johansson from KSMB and Strindbergs. They released the single (Komma ut ur matchen) NU!. A Swedish version of (Gotta get som action) NOW! They were joined by musicians such as Anders "Boba" Lindström and Dregen from Hellacopters and Sulo from Diamond Dogs. The single also contained the song 8 pm, an English version of the KSMB song Klockan 8. Along with fellow Hellacopter member Robert Dahlqvist, Andersson recorded drums and guitars for Swedish singer/songwriter Stefan Sundströms 2004 album Hjärtats melodi. Apart from being a producer/co-producer with his own bands, Andersson produced Swedish rock band Dollhouse's second album The Royal Rendezevous in Acetone Studio, Stockholm in late 2005. Also at Acetone Studio he played on Neil Leyton's The Betrayal of the Self album along with Backyard Babies's guitarist Dregen. The next year he produced the Backyard Babies fifth studio album People Like People Like People Like Us. In 2009, it has been announced that Andersson and Neil Leyton have a side-project called The Point, with a 7" single titled "Give it a try" due to be released in the spring of 2010.

Musical equipment

Guitars

 Greco 1977 Les Paul Standard – Chambered body Tobacco Sunburst. It has three custom fitted pickups, one DiMarzio Super Distortion in the bridge position and two DiMarzio Classic PAF in the middle and neck positions. This guitar was given as a birthday gift to Nicke Andersson on his 40th birthday, August 2012. All custom work and fitting done by luthier Janne Helge.  
 Berg Electric Guitars "Goblin" – Custom built for Nicke Andersson with a single Dimarzio Super Distortion humbucker in the bridge position. 
High gloss black with 
Bent maple bindings (appearing to be cream plastic to the naked eye) on body, head and neck. 
Made by then- apprentice luthier, Thomas Berg, as a qualifying piece of work.
Mr Berg has also built The Imperial model guitar (based on the early hard radius edge body Epiphone Coronet with custom features including a Crestwood headstock) for Tobias Egge and Nicke.
Berg Electric Guitars "Imperial" built for Imperial State Electric guitarists Tobias Egge and Nicke Andersson by Thomas Berg of Berg Electric Guitars.
Based on the symmetrical shaped, hard radius edge body Epiphone Coronet (later Coronet models had more rounded edges on body)
Custom features include a Crestwood deluxe style bound, inline headstock, J200 type inlay, single Dimarzio DP100 and a wraparound bridge.
 Greco Les Paul Standard – black with white body binding.
 Eagle 12-string – "The Eaglebacker", a 12-string Rickenbacker clone.
 TYM Guitars The Royale – Andersson's signature guitar.
 TYM Guitars Wosrite Black Beauty
 TYM Guitars Johnny Ramone model
 TYM Guitars Versatone
 Mosrite – Ventures Model reissue.
 Halkan Crestwood Deluxe – Replica made in Sweden.
 Daguet – Epiphone Crestwood replica.
 Gibson SG Custom – Creamwhite finish with three humbuckers.
 Mosrite Ventures model
 Gordon Smith GS LP Junior – Single cutaway.
 Gordon Smith GS LP Junior – Dubble cutaway.
 Gibson Les Paul Junior – Single P-90 pickup.
 Gibson Les Paul Custom
 Iceman – Custom built by Sengenbjerg with three humbuckers.s.
 DiPinto Mach IV – All black finish two single coil pickups.
 Gibson Flying V – Converted to lefthand
 Hagström bass

Amplification
 Orange OTR-12 amplifier
 Marshall Amplifiers
 Fender Twin Reverb
 Lehnert Rambler 25w combo

Band timeline 
 Nihilist (drums (1987–1989))
 Mezzrow (bass (1988–1989))
 Entombed (drums (1989-1997, 2016–present), vocals (1991))
 The Hellacopters (guitars, vocals (1994–2008, 2016–present))
 Daemon (Drums (1996))
 Supershit 666 (as Nick Royale: drums (1999))
 The Hydromatics (as Nick Royale: drums, percussion, backing vocals (1999))
 Kurt-Sunes med Helveteshundarna (vocals, guitars (2004))
 Death Breath (drums, guitars) (2005–present)
 The Solution (as Nick Royale: drums, percussion, guitars, backing vocals (2004–present))
 Imperial State Electric (vocals, guitars (2008–present))
 Lucifer (drums, guitar, bass (2017–present))

Selected discography

References 

1972 births
Swedish multi-instrumentalists
Swedish heavy metal musicians
Swedish songwriters
Swedish heavy metal singers
Swedish guitarists
Male guitarists
Swedish rock guitarists
Swedish heavy metal guitarists
Swedish bass guitarists
Swedish heavy metal bass guitarists
Swedish drummers
Male drummers
Death metal musicians
Swedish heavy metal drummers
Swedish record producers
Music industry executives
Living people
Male bass guitarists
21st-century Swedish singers
21st-century drummers
21st-century bass guitarists
21st-century Swedish male singers
Entombed (band) members
The Hellacopters members
The Solution (band) members
Death Breath members